Fight to Win is a 1987 martial arts comedy film directed by Leo Fong and starring Cynthia Rothrock, George Chung, Richard Norton and Chuck Jeffreys. In the film, martial artist Ryan Kim has an upcoming fight and gets training from a martial arts master, Sensei Lauren.

Plot 
Fight to Win is a martial arts comedy.  A man has an important match coming up soon and has to train for it. He has just a month to get ready. A female karate master helps him train and prepare for it. After the match where he defeats the man, she has the crime syndicate that the defeated man belongs to. Ryan Kim is played by George Chung and Sensei Lauren is played by Cynthia Rothrock.

Background
The film was shot on location in Northern California.

Some references to the film refer to the story as being about a renowned statue becomes the object of desire for two martial arts masters.

The film is also known as Eyes of the Dragon and Dangerous Passages.

References

External links
fist of b-list Fight to Win (1987) review
Film-Ente, die Webseite für Film-Fans: Eyes of the Dragon

1987 films
1987 action films
1987 independent films
1987 martial arts films
American action films
American independent films
American martial arts films
Films directed by Leo Fong
Films shot in California
1980s English-language films
1980s American films